Turned Out Nice Again is a 1941 British comedy film directed by Marcel Varnel and starring the Lancashire-born comedian George Formby.

Made at Ealing Studios, Turned Out Nice Again premiered at the London Pavilion Cinema on 29 June 1941.

Plot
George Pearson, an employee at an underwear factory, is caught between his modern wife and his meddling mother. After buying a special yarn and getting his wife to promote it, he has an argument with his boss, Mr Dawson who insults Pearson's wife and refuses to apologise.  Pearson then resigns. After finding out that the yarn is actually worth a fair amount, Mr Dawson tries to buy it from Pearson but he has some competition.

Cast list

George Formby as George Pearson
Peggy Bryan as Lydia Pearson
Edward Chapman as Uncle Arnold
Elliott Mason as Mrs Pearson
Mackenzie Ward as Gerald Dawson
O. B. Clarence as Mr Dawson
Ronald Ward as Nelson
John Salew as Largon
Wilfrid Hyde-White as Removal man
Hay Petrie as Drunk
Michael Rennie as Diner

Songs
The songs performed by Formby in the film are:

"Auntie Maggies Remedy" (Formby/Latta)
"You Can't Go Wrong In These" (MacDougal)
"The Emperor Of Lancashire" (MacDougal)
"You're Everything To Me" (MacDougal)

References
Notes

Citations

External links
 

1941 films
Films directed by Marcel Varnel
Associated Talking Pictures
Ealing Studios films
British comedy films
1941 comedy films
Films set in England
Films set in London
Films set in Lancashire
Films produced by Michael Balcon
British black-and-white films
Films with screenplays by Basil Dearden
1940s British films